Troublesome Night 5 is a 1999 Hong Kong horror comedy film produced by Nam Yin and directed by Herman Yau. It is the fifth of the 20 films in the Troublesome Night film series.

Plot
This film contains three loosely connected segments. In the first segment, Cheung, a night shift taxi driver, picks up five different passengers on the same night: an injured triad boss, a woman pretending to be a ghost, a mysterious old woman, an edgy woman, and the ghost of a traffic policeman.

In the second segment, Cheung's friend, Fat, moves to a new apartment with his wife and son. He continues to gamble compulsively despite being already heavily in debt. One night, after discovering that his new home is haunted, he asks the ghost to help him win every time he gambles; in return, he will share half of everything he has with the ghost. He soon regrets the Faustian bargain he made but it is too late. The ghost wants him to share not just his fortune, but also his wife, and even the number of years he is destined to live. Left with no choice, his wife and son abandon him. Fat commits suicide by setting himself on fire while sitting on the rocking chair that belonged to the ghost.

In the third segment, Fat's son, On, has grown up while Cheung has quit driving and started his own private security company. Cheung hires On and assigns him to work the night shift in an office building. One night, On and two colleagues encounter a ghostly old woman and end up on a non-existent 14th floor. While escaping from the building, On has a vision of the haunted apartment he lived in when he was a boy. When his mother learns about the incident, she wants to accompany the three of them while they reenact their escape, so that she can meet up with her husband's ghost. Their attempt is successful; Fat's ghost reunites with his family, who forgive him, and he departs in peace. On also becomes more mature and sensible after the encounter.

Cast
 Louis Koo as Fat
 Simon Lui as Cheung
 Law Lan as old woman
 Wayne Lai as Sing
 Frankie Ng as Wah
 Chin Kar-lok as Big B
 Perrie Lai as Big B's girlfriend
 Amanda Lee as Fat's wife
 John Tang as On (Fat's son)
 Natalie Wong as edgy woman
 Ben Ng as ghost in apartment
 Emily Kwan as fake ghost
 Lee Kin-yan as traffic policeman
 Mok Wai-man as security guard

External links
 
 

1999 films
1990s comedy horror films
Hong Kong comedy horror films
1990s Cantonese-language films
1999 horror films
Troublesome Night (film series)
1999 comedy films
1990s Hong Kong films